Kamphaengphet Provincial Administrative Organization Stadium or Cha Kung Rao Stadium is a multi-purpose stadium in Kamphaeng Phet Province, Thailand.  It is currently used mostly for football matches and is the home stadium of Kamphaeng Phet F.C.  The stadium holds 2,406 people.

Football venues in Thailand
Multi-purpose stadiums in Thailand
Buildings and structures in Kamphaeng Phet province